The 2000 NCAA Division I baseball tournament was played at the end of the 2000 NCAA Division I baseball season to determine the national champion of college baseball.  The tournament concluded with eight teams competing in the College World Series, a double-elimination tournament in its fifty fourth year.  Sixteen regional competitions were held to determine the participants in the final event, with each winner advancing to a best of three series against another regional champion for the right to play in the College World Series.  Each region was composed of four teams, resulting in 64 teams participating in the tournament at the conclusion of their regular season, and in some cases, after a conference tournament.  The fifty-fourth tournament's champion was LSU, coached by Skip Bertman. The Most Outstanding Player was Trey Hodges of LSU.

National seeds
Bold indicates CWS participant.
South Carolina
LSU
Georgia Tech
Clemson
Houston
Florida State
Arizona State
Stanford

Regionals and super regionals

Bold indicates winner. * indicates host.

Columbia Super Regional

Baton Rouge Super Regional

Atlanta Super Regional

Clemson Super Regional

Houston Super Regional

Tallahassee Super Regional

Austin Super Regional
Hosted by Texas at Disch–Falk Field in Austin, Texas

Palo Alto Super Regional

Notes on tournament field
 Army, Butler, and Wagner were making their first NCAA tournament appearance.

College World Series

Participants

Results

Bracket

Game results

All-Tournament Team

The following players were members of the College World Series All-Tournament Team.

Notable players
 Clemson: 
 Florida State: Sam Scott
 LSU: Trey Hodges, Brian Tallet, Ryan Theriot, Mike Fontenot, Brad Hawpe, Brad Cresse, Ray Wright
 Louisiana–Lafayette: Scott Dohmann
 San Jose State: 
 Stanford: Joe Borchard, Justin Wayne
 Texas: Beau Hale, Phil Seibel, Ryan Hubele, Tommy Nicholson, Todd West, Charlie Thames
 USC: Mark Prior

References

NCAA Division I Baseball Championship
 
NCAA Division I baseball tournament
Baseball in Austin, Texas
Baseball in Houston
Baseball in Waco, Texas